Jalan Besar, Kluang, or Kluang Middle Ring Road, Federal Route 173, is a federal road in Kluang town, Johor, Malaysia.

Features
At most sections, the Federal Route 173 was built under the JKR R5 road standard, allowing maximum speed limit of up to 90 km/h.

List of junctions

References

Malaysian Federal Roads